The 1935 All-Eastern football team consists of American football players chosen by various selectors as the best players at each position among the Eastern colleges and universities during the 1935 college football season.

All-Eastern selections

Quarterbacks
 Ken Sandbach, Princeton (AP-1, INS-1, NEA-1)

Halfbacks
 Monk Meyer, Army (AP-1, INS-1)
 Hubert Randour, Pittsburgh (NEA-1, PW)
 Smith, NYU (NEA-1, PW [fb])
 Tuffy Leemans, George Washington (INS-1, PW [qb])
 J. Snead Schmidt, Navy (AP-1)
 Morris, Holy Cross (PW)

Fullbacks
 Vannie Albanese, Syracuse (AP-1, INS-1)
 Joe Maniaci, Fordham (NEA-1)

Ends
 William R. Shuler, Army (AP-1, NEA-1)
 Bob Train, Yale (INS-1, NEA-1, PW)
 Walter Winika, Rutgers (AP-1)
 Gilbert Lea, Princeton (INS-1, PW)

Tackles
 Charles Wasicek, Colgate (AP-1, INS-1, NEA-1, PW)
 Edward Michaels, Villanova (AP-1)
 Joe Stydahar, West Virginia (NEA-1)
 Moody Sarno, Fordham (INS-1, PW)

Guards
 Jac Weller, Princeton (AP-1, INS-1)
 Michaels, Villanova (NEA-1, PW)
 Philip Flanagan, Holy Cross (AP-1)
 Edward A. Jontos, Syracuse (INS-1)
 Gaffney, Harvard (NEA-1)
 Bill Montgomery, Princeton (PW)

Centers
 Stephen Cullinan, Princeton (AP-1)
 Louis Robertshaw, Navy (INS-1, PW)
 Ray, Dartmouth (NEA-1)

Key
 AP = Associated Press
 UP = United Press
 INS = International News Service
 NEA = Newspaper Enterprise Association
 PW = Pop Warner

See also
 1935 College Football All-America Team

References

All-Eastern
All-Eastern college football teams